Melvin Nicholas Held (born April 12, 1929) is an American former professional baseball player. He appeared in four Major League Baseball games as a relief pitcher for the Baltimore Orioles at the outset of the  season, and had a 13-year career in minor league baseball.

Held, nicknamed "Country", was a nine-year minor league veteran when he pitched for the Orioles in 1956, having signed with the team when it was the St. Louis Browns in 1947. His performance during the 1955 season for the San Antonio Missions of the Class AA Texas League — he posted a 24–7 won-lost record and a 2.87 earned run average — earned him a call-up to Baltimore the following year.

In his first two MLB games, on April 27–28, Held pitched a total of three innings of scoreless relief against the Washington Senators. In his next two appearances, however, in May against the first-division Cleveland Indians and New York Yankees, Held surrendered four earned runs and five hits in four innings. Altogether, Held gave up seven hits in seven innings pitched in MLB, with three walks and four strikeouts. Held was sent back to the minor leagues for good at the May cutdown. His career continued through 1959, and he won 131 minor-league games.

References

External links
Major League record and career statistics from Baseball Reference

1929 births
Living people
Baltimore Orioles players
Baseball players from Ohio
Major League Baseball pitchers
Minneapolis Millers (baseball) players
People from Williams County, Ohio
San Antonio Missions players
Vancouver Mounties players
Wichita Indians players